Luasamotu is an uninhabited islet of Vaitupu, Tuvalu. Luasamotu on the reef off the eastern part of Vaitupu known as Matangi.

See also

 Desert island
 List of islands

References

Uninhabited islands of Tuvalu
Vaitupu